Saint Agathangelus of Rome (died 312), was a Roman deacon and disciple of Clement of Ancyra, was a martyr during the reign of emperor Diocletian. He met Clement when the latter was imprisoned in Rome, and traveled back to Ancyra with him where they were both beheaded. According to the Gregorian calendar, his and Clement's feast day is on January 23 but on February 5 according to the Julian calendar which is used in some Eastern Orthodox countries.

References

External links
Patron saint article on Agathangelus.
Saint of the Day, January 23:  Agathangelus . at SaintPatrickDC.org
OCA article for 23 January saints.

3rd-century births
312 deaths
4th-century Christian clergy
Saints from Roman Anatolia
4th-century Christian martyrs
4th-century Romans